You Can't Do That on Stage Anymore, Vol. 3 is a double disc live album by Frank Zappa, spanning from December 10, 1971, to December 23, 1984. It was released in 1989 (see 1989 in music).

"Sharleena" had been previously issued as a flexi disc in Guitar Player magazine. All the songs on disc one are by the 1984 band (except for brief segments of "Drowning Witch" edited in from the 1982 tour). Disc two includes performances from various years including a section of "King Kong" taken from the December 10, 1971, Rainbow Theatre concert, performed shortly before Zappa was pushed off the stage by an audience member. Zappa's liner notes state that after he played his solo the attack happened "moments later," but in his autobiography he wrote (consistent with the memories of other band members) that the incident took place after the band had finished its encore, a cover of the Beatles song "I Want to Hold Your Hand".

The album contains performances of "Cocaine Decisions" and "Nig Biz" from a concert in Palermo, Italy on July 14, 1982. During "Cocaine Decisions", an audience riot began and police shot tear gas into the auditorium. A canister can be heard triggering near the stage, and between songs, Zappa and roadie Massimo Bassoli are heard attempting to calm the crowd down. Zappa was later reported stating, "We played for an hour and a half with tear-gas in our face and everything else, and when it was all over we went off stage and we were trapped inside this place."

Track listing
All songs by Frank Zappa except where noted.

Personnel
Frank Zappa – arranger, editing, keyboards, lyricist, vocals, producer, main performer, liner notes, guitar, compilation
Mark Volman – vocals
Howard Kaylan – vocals
Steve Vai – guitar
Dweezil Zappa – guitar
Ike Willis – rhythm guitar, vocals
Ray White – rhythm guitar, vocals
Allan Zavod – keyboards
Andre Lewis – keyboards
Don Preston – keyboards, electronics
George Duke – keyboards, vocals
Tommy Mars – keyboards, vocals
Bobby Martin – keyboards, vocals, saxophone
Ian Underwood – alto saxophone, keyboards
Jim Pons – bass guitar, vocals
Scott Thunes – bass guitar, vocals, synthesizer
Tom Fowler – bass guitar
Chester Thompson – drums
Chad Wackerman – drums, vocals
Aynsley Dunbar – drums
Terry Bozzio – drums, speech
Ralph Humphrey – drums
Ruth Underwood – percussion, keyboards
Ed Mann – percussion
Napoleon Murphy Brock – saxophone, vocals
Bruce Fowler– trombone
Diva Zappa – lyricist
Mark Pinske – chief engineer
Kerry McNabb – engineer
Bob Stone – engineer, remixing, supervisor

References

External links
Lyrics and information
Release details

1989 live albums
Frank Zappa live albums
Rykodisc live albums
Sequel albums